Sultanganj Assembly constituency is one of 243 constituencies of legislative assembly of Bihar. It is a part of Banka Lok Sabha constituency along with other assembly constituencies viz. Amarpur, Dhoraiya, Banka, Katoria and Belhar.

Overview
Sultanganj comprises CD Blocks Sultanganj & Shahkund.

Members of Legislative Assembly

Election

2020

2015

2010

References

External links
 

Politics of Bhagalpur district
Assembly constituencies of Bihar